A transcontinental flight is a non-stop passenger flight from one side of a continent to the other. The term usually refers to flights across the United States, between the East and West Coasts.

History
The first transcontinental multi-stop flight across the United States was made in 1911 by Calbraith Perry Rodgers in an attempt to win the Hearst prize offered by publisher William Randolph Hearst. Hearst offered a $US 50,000 prize to the first aviator to fly coast to coast, in either direction, in less than 30 days from start to finish. Previous attempts by James J. Ward and Henry Atwood had been unsuccessful.

Rodgers persuaded J. Ogden Armour, of Armour and Company, to sponsor the flight, and in return he named the plane after Armour's grape soft drink "Vin Fiz". Rodgers left from Sheepshead Bay, New York, on September 17, 1911, at 4:30pm, carrying the first transcontinental mail pouch. He crossed the Rocky Mountains on November 5, 1911, and landed at Tournament Park in Pasadena, California, at 4:04pm, in front of a crowd of 20,000 people. He had missed the prize deadline by 19 days. He was accompanied on the ground by a support crew that repaired and rebuilt the plane after each crash landing. The trip required 70 stops.

On December 10, 1911, he flew to Long Beach, California, and symbolically taxied his plane into the Pacific Ocean.

Timeline of early transcontinental flights
1911 - James J. Ward, failed attempt.
1911 - Henry Atwood, failed attempt.
1911 - Calbraith Perry Rodgers - Start: September 17, 1911, at 4:30 pm; finish: November 5, 1911.
1912 - Robert George Fowler - Start: September 11, 1911; finish: February 8, 1912.
1923 - First non-stop flight from Long Island, New York to Rockwell Field, San Diego by Lt. John Macready and Lt. Oakley Kelly in a Fokker T-2
1929 - The Buhl Airsedan "Spokane Sun-God" was the first aircraft to make a non-stop US transcontinental round-trip flight on August 15, 1929 (Nick Mamer and Art Walker flew it from Spokane, Washington, to New York City and back between August 15 and 21, 1929, taking 120 hours 1 minute 40 seconds).
1930 - Frank Hawks flew from San Diego to New York in a towed glider leaving San Diego March 30, 1930 and arriving in New York eight days later.
1932 - First scheduled cross-country through passenger flights (no change of plane).
1933 - Transcontinental passenger flights in as little as 20 hours on the Boeing 247.
1934 - First three-stop airline flights (TWA DC-2s).
1946 - First one-stop airline flights (United DC-4s and TWA Constellations).
1953 - First sustained nonstop airline flights (TWA may have flown some LA-NY nonstops in 1947).
1957 - First transcontinental flight to average supersonic speed. John Glenn flew from Naval Air Station Los Alamitos, California to Floyd Bennett Field, New York in 3 hours and 23 minutes.

Transcontinental air speed record
In-flight and on-ground time are counted after the earliest flights

Junior transcontinental air speed record
For the junior record only in-flight time is counted at a certain speed

Women's transcontinental air speed record
For the women's record, only in-flight time is counted

See also
World record
Dawn-to-dusk transcontinental flight across the United States
Flight altitude record
Transcontinental railroad
Flyover country

References

Bibliography
Glines, Carroll V. 1995. Roscoe Turner; Aviation's Master Showman. Smithsonian Institution Press 
Kinert, Reed. 1967. Racing Planes and Air Races: A Complete History, Vol.2 1924-1931. Aero Publishers Inc ASIN B000J40KCU

Civil aviation in the United States
Aviation records
Air racing
North American records